Federico Vizcarra (born 25 November 1964) is a Mexican judoka. He competed at the 1984 Summer Olympics and the 1988 Summer Olympics.

References

1964 births
Living people
Mexican male judoka
Olympic judoka of Mexico
Judoka at the 1984 Summer Olympics
Judoka at the 1988 Summer Olympics
Place of birth missing (living people)